The 2022–23 Tarleton State Texans men's basketball team represented Tarleton State University in the 2022–23 NCAA Division I men's basketball season. The Texans, led by third-year head coach Billy Gillispie, played their home games at the Wisdom Gym in Stephenville, Texas, as members of the Western Athletic Conference.

The season marked Tarleton State's third year of a four-year transition period from Division II to Division I. As a result, the Texans were not eligible to play in the NCAA tournament, but were eligible to play in the WAC tournament. Additionally, the Texas received an invitation to the College Basketball Invitational (CBI), their first postseason tournament as a Division-I school.

Previous season
The Texans finished the 2021–22 season 14–17, 9–9 in WAC play to finish in eighth place. Due to their current transition to Division I, they are ineligible for the WAC tournament.

Roster

Schedule and results

|-
!colspan=12 style=| Exhibition

|-
!colspan=12 style=| Regular season

|-
!colspan=9 style=| WAC tournament

|-
!colspan=12 style=| College Basketball Invitational

|-

Sources

References

Tarleton State Texans men's basketball seasons
Tarleton State
Tarleton State
Tarleton State Texans men's basketball
Tarleton State Texans men's basketball